CFNA-FM is a Canadian radio station, broadcasting at 99.7 FM in Bonnyville, Alberta. The station airs a country format branded as Country 99.

The station was originally launched in 2003 by 912038 Alberta Ltd. as a rebroadcaster of CKLM-FM in Lloydminster. It officially became a separate station with its own studios and program schedule on September 28, 2007. The station originally had an active rock format. The station was sold to Vista Broadcast Group on November 21, 2008. The music format was changed to country by Vista Radio in early 2009, when the name was changed from The Goat to The Wolf. The name was changed again in 2014 to 99 Country FM.

References

External links
 Country 99
 CFNA-FM history - Canadian Communications Foundation
 

FNA
FNA
FNA
Radio stations established in 2007
2007 establishments in Alberta
Municipal District of Bonnyville No. 87